José Policarpo da Cunha, known as Zeca Cunha (12 August 1935 – 10 September 2013) was a Hong Kong field hockey player. He competed in the men's tournament at the 1964 Summer Olympics.

References

External links
 

1935 births
2013 deaths
Hong Kong male field hockey players
Olympic field hockey players of Hong Kong
Field hockey players at the 1964 Summer Olympics
Place of birth missing